Salegentibacter chungangensis is a Gram-negative, strictly aerobic and rod-shaped bacterium from the genus of Salegentibacter which has been isolated from a marine sand.

References

Flavobacteria
Bacteria described in 2014